The event was held on February 20, 2002 at the Deer Valley Resort. Kostelic and Pärson both won medals for the second time in the Olympics.

Results
Complete results from the women's slalom event at the 2002 Winter Olympics.

References

External links
Official Olympic Report

Slalom